The 2011–12 Azadegan League was the 21st season of the Azadegan League and 11th as the second highest division since its establishment in 1991. The season featured 21 teams from the 2010–11 Azadegan League, three new teams relegated from the 2010–11 Persian Gulf Cup: PAS Hamedan, Paykan and Steel Azin and three new teams promoted from the 2010–11 2nd Division: Saipa Shomal as champions, Niroye Zamini and Parseh Tehran. Esteghlal Khuzestan replaced Esteghlal Jonoub Tehran. Damash Lorestan changed their name into Gahar Zagros while Hamyari Arak changed their name into Shahrdari Arak. The league started on 14 September 2011 and ended on 19 April 2012. Paykan won the Azadegan League title for the first time in their history. Paykan, Aluminium Hormozgan and Gahar Zagros promoted to the Persian Gulf Cup.

Teams
The league will feature three clubs relegated from Iran Pro League: Steel Azin returned to the Azadegan League after two seasons in the top division, whereas Paykan were relegated after a two-year stint. The third team Pas Hamedan, were relegated for the first time in club history to a lower league.

Group A

Group B

Managerial changes

Standings

Group A

Group B

Results table

Group A

Group B

Play Off 
First leg played on 1 May 2012; return leg to be played on 8 May 2012

Winner is promoted to the Persian Gulf Cup

Final 
The Final scheduled to play on 2 May 2012

Player statistics

Top scorers, Group A

Top scorers, Group B

Attendance

Average home attendance

Highest attendance

Notes:Updated to games played on 19 April 2012. Source: iplstats.com

See also
 2011–12 Persian Gulf Cup
 2011–12 Iran Football's 2nd Division
 2011–12 Iran Football's 3rd Division
 2011–12 Hazfi Cup
 Iranian Super Cup
 2011–12 Iranian Futsal Super League

References

External links
 آیین نامه مسابقات لیگ دسته اول، دسته دوم و دسته سوم کشور فصل 91-90

Azadegan League seasons
Iran
2011–12 in Iranian football leagues